Lipicze  is a village in the administrative district of Gmina Kłomnice, within Częstochowa County, Silesian Voivodeship, in southern Poland.

The village has a population of 345.

References

Lipicze